This is a list of public holidays in Cayman Islands.

References

Cayman Islands
Cayman Islands